Mária Érdi (born 18 February 1998) is a Hungarian competitive sailor.

She competed at the 2016 Summer Olympics in Rio de Janeiro, in the women's Laser Radial. She competed at the 2020 Summer Olympics in Tokyo 2021, in Laser Radial.

References

External links
 
 

1998 births
Living people
Hungarian female sailors (sport)
Olympic sailors of Hungary
Sailors at the 2016 Summer Olympics – Laser Radial
Sailors at the 2014 Summer Youth Olympics
Sailors at the 2020 Summer Olympics – Laser Radial
Sportspeople from Budapest